Celebrity Family Feud is an American television game show, based on Family Feud created by Mark Goodson. The series is produced by Fremantle, with Feudin' Productions for the first season and Triple Threat Productions for the subsequent seasons. It premiered on NBC on June 24, 2008, with Al Roker hosting, and was canceled in March 2009. In April 2015, ABC announced a new incarnation of the show, which premiered on June 21, 2015, and hosted by Steve Harvey. The series is taped in front of a live audience in Los Angeles, outside several episodes in 2020 due to the COVID-19 pandemic. Thom Beers, Gaby Johnston, and Jennifer Mullin serve as executive producers.

Series overview

Episodes

Season 1 (2008)

Season 2 (2015)

Season 3 (2016)

Season 4 (2017)

Season 5 (2018)

Season 6 (2019)

Season 7 (2020)

Season 8 (2021)

Season 9 (2022)

References

External links
 

Celebrity Family Feud
Family Feud